N7 Real Estate is a real estate company operating worldwide with a significant presence in Dubai, Melbourne (Australia), and Pakistan.

Overview 
N7 real estate was founded in 2011, by CEO Adil Safdar. The first branch was formed in Australia in 2011 providing real estate services in the state. In 2019, N7 was named the top real estate company in Dubai. In 2021, N7 international Caroline branch in Australia came into being. In the same year, a branch in Islamabad (Pakistan) was launched. 

N7 has invested in social welfare projects in Pakistan and provided aftari and sehri to the fasting Muslims during Ramazan.

Brett Lee is an investor in N7 Real Estate. The company have a partnership with Damac properties and other developers in Dubai, including Real Estate Leaders including Emaar, Nshama, Dubai Holding, Meraas, Nakheel, Damac, District 1, Sobha, Select group, Ellington, and several other legit developers.

References 

Property companies of the United Arab Emirates